P. Muthukumaraswamy Sarma was a Carnatic musician and a music educator. He was a prime disciple of M. M. Dandapani Desikar at Annamalai University during the 1950s.

Early life
Born in Yaazhpaanam, Sri Lanka to parents Paramasamy Gurukkal and Rathinamma, on 23 August 1932, he lost his father at a very early age. After completing his secondary education in Yaazhpaanam, he went to India during the late 1950s and joined Annamalai University as a music student. His educator was M. M. Dandapani Desikar who was a great exponent of Tamil Hindu religious hymns and Tamil keerthanas. Muthukumaraswamy followed suit his Guru and himself became a great exponent of Tamil songs.

Musical journey
After graduating from Annamalai University, he went back to Yaazhpaanam and got appointed as a music teacher in government owned schools. He taught music to students at various schools in Jaffna.
After the ethnic strife in Sri Lanka, he  shifted to Chennai in 1986 along with his family. It was a homecoming of sorts, as he belonged to a family that had migrated to Yaazhpaanam from Kanchipuram.
He performed music concerts in Chennai Sabhas and private events. He also taught music to many students. Some leading vocalists, including Sudha Ragunathan learned Tamil Kritis from him.
He was a music educator at Annamalai University till he was 86 years of age.
Being an ardent disciple of Dandapani Desikar, he arranged thematic kutcheris in many sabhas in Chennai to mark Desikar's centenary during the music festival of 2008. He celebrated his Guru's remembrance day every year and also popularised Desikar's nine compositions on Madurai Meenakshi Amman.
Singer Sudha Ragunathan is quoted as saying "Whenever I wanted to learn a special Tamil song, he would be there. I have never seen another musician as generous and as forthcoming in sharing his knowledge."

Family
Muthukumaraswamy Sarma was married to Nalina Ranjani and the couple have four sons - Kalatharan, Artist Pathmavasan, Sarangadharan and Kumaran and a daughter - Geetha.

Publications
He edited and published periodicals titled Isai Aruvi, Kalai Aruvi and Isai Yedu.

Death
Muthukumaraswamy Sarma was ailing for some time due to old age and died, aged 87, on 25 June 2019 at his residence in Kottivakkam, Chennai. His funeral took place in Besant Nagar crematorium on 26 June Wednesday.

References

External links
 - 'Who knows the boundaries of music?' a rendition of Desikar's composition by Muthukumaraswamy
P.Muthukumarasamy : Dandapani Desikar's chosen disciple

Carnatic singers
Indian music educators